Ian Skelly is a British writer, continuity announcer and BBC radio presenter. Born in Manchester, he grew up in West Lancashire and studied at Birmingham City University.

Broadcasting career

He started to work for the BBC in Birmingham in the late 1980s before joining BBC Radio 3. Skelly has appeared on Radio 3 in concert broadcasts, BBC Proms and on shows like Breakfast and In Tune. In 2018 Skelly became presenter of the morning show Essential Classics. It was announced that he would leave the show in March 2021 to become one of the presenters of Afternoon Concert.

Writing

In 2010 he coauthored a book about climate change: Harmony: A New Way of Looking at Our World, with Charles, Prince of Wales and Tony Juniper.

References

External links
Afternoon Concert (BBC Radio 3)

Living people
British writers
British television presenters
BBC Radio 3 presenters
Year of birth missing (living people)
Writers from Manchester